Artesiidae is a family of crustaceans belonging to the order Amphipoda.

Genera:
 Artesia Holsinger, 1980
 Spelaeogammarus da Silva Brum, 1975

References

Amphipoda